James Iredell (October 5, 1751 – October 20, 1799) was one of the first Justices of the Supreme Court of the United States.  He was appointed by President George Washington and served from 1790 until his death in 1799. His son, James Iredell Jr., was a Governor of North Carolina.

Early life
James Iredell was born in Lewes, England, the oldest of five surviving children of Francis Iredell, a Bristol merchant and his wife, the former Margaret MucCulloh of Ireland. The failure of his father's business (and health) impelled James to emigrate to the Colonies in 1767 at the age of 17. Relatives assisted him in obtaining a position in the customs service as deputy collector, or comptroller, of the port of Edenton, North Carolina.

While working at the customs house, Iredell read law under Samuel Johnston (later governor of North Carolina), began the practice of law and was admitted to the bar in 1771.  The grandson of a clergyman, he was a devout Anglican throughout his life and his writings display an interest in spirituality and metaphysics beyond a simple attachment to organized religion.

In 1773, Iredell married Johnston's sister Hannah and the two had four children after twelve childless years. In 1774 he was made collector for the port.

Roles in the Revolution

Although employed by the British government, Iredell was a strong supporter of independence and the revolution. In 1774, he wrote To the Inhabitants of Great Britain where he laid out arguments opposing the concept of parliamentary supremacy over America. This essay established Iredell, then 23, as the most influential political essayist in North Carolina at that time.  His treatise Principles of an American Whig predates and echoes themes and ideas of the Declaration of Independence.

After the revolution began, Iredell helped organize the court system of North Carolina, and was elected a judge of the superior court in 1778. His career advanced through a number of political and judicial posts in the state, including that of attorney general from 1779 to 1781. In 1787 the state assembly appointed him commissioner and charged him with compiling and revising the laws of North Carolina. His work was published in 1791 as Iredell's Revisal.

Following the Revolution, financial limitations barred his being a delegate to the Philadelphia convention, he corresponded regularly with the North Carolina delegates.  Iredell was a leader of the Federalists in North Carolina, and a strong supporter of the proposed Constitution. In the 1788 convention at Hillsborough, he argued unsuccessfully in favor of its adoption.  Iredell was the floor leader for the Federalists.  (North Carolina later ratified the Constitution after Congress amended it through the addition of the Bill of Rights.)  After the convention failed to ratify the Constitution, he continued to promote it, joining William R. Davie (the later founder of the University of North Carolina), to publish the convention debates at their own expense for distribution across the state.

Supreme Court Justice

On February 8, 1790, President George Washington nominated Iredell as an associate justice on the newly established United States Supreme Court, and on May 10, he was confirmed by the United States Senate. He was sworn into office two days later, on May 12.

The case load of the first Supreme Court was light. In fact, the court did not hear its first case until 1791 when it decided West v. Barnes. The decision was unanimous, but Iredell requested that Congress change the harsh statute governing the West decision. The Justices gathered to hear arguments only twice a year, and there are only a handful of opinions written by Justice Iredell in his years on the court. Of them, two of the most significant are:

 Chisholm v. Georgia (1793): At issue was whether the citizens of one state (South Carolina) could sue another state (Georgia) for repayment of Revolutionary War bills. Iredell was the lone dissent from the majority opinion that held that a state may be sued in federal court without its consent to the suit.
 Calder v. Bull (1798): At issue was whether an act of the Connecticut legislature violated the Constitution because it was an ex post facto law, forbidden pursuant to Article I, Section 9, Clause 3.

In the Chisholm case, public and political opinion agreed with Iredell against the other Justices. The outcry and strong reaction of people against the Chisholm decision would lead to its reversal by the adoption of the Eleventh Amendment in 1795.

In the unanimous decision in Calder, the Court held that the Clause applied to criminal cases only, deciding that the legislature's act was not unconstitutional. More importantly, Calder raised the question of whether "principles of natural justice" constituted law. Iredell's opinion indicated that only those actions of a state that explicitly violated a textual provision of the Constitution could be declared void. He stated, "The principles of natural justice are regulated by no fixed standard; the ablest and the purest men have differed upon the subject; and all the court could properly say, in such an event, would be, that the legislature (possessed of an equal right of opinion) had passed an act which, in the opinion of the judges, was inconsistent with the abstract principles of natural justice."  Scholars have pointed to Iredell's essay To The Public as one of the clearest and best reasoned defenses of Judicial Review.

Justice Iredell's opinion in Calder helped establish the principle of judicial review five years before it was tested in Marbury v. Madison (1803). The Supreme Court has followed Iredell's approach throughout its subsequent history.

Iredell's charge to the federal grand jury in Fries' Case is commonly cited as evidence that the framers' intent was to limit the scope of the First Amendment to freedom from prior restraint. He praised Sir William Blackstone's narrow interpretation of freedom of the press, noted that the framers were very familiar with Blackstone's work, and observed that "unless his explanation had been satisfactory, I presume the amendment would have been more particularly worded, to guard against any possible mistake."

Later years
The Judiciary Act of 1789 divided the United States into 13 districts, each district having a court in one of 13 major cities.  It also established three circuits or appeals courts—one each in the eastern, central and southern United States. Unlike the modern Supreme Court sitting together in the capital to decide cases, Supreme Court Justices were required to "ride circuit" or travel to the various circuits, and hear cases and appeals twice each year. Partially due to the heavy burden of travel, Justice Iredell's health failed and he died suddenly on October 20, 1799, in Edenton, North Carolina. He was 48.

Slavery 
Iredell mirrored contemporaries like Thomas Jefferson and George Washington in openly condemning slavery while participating in the practice itself. Iredell owned 14 slaves in 1786, and he and his wife Hannah both owned slaves at the time of their deaths.

As a lawyer, Iredell assisted in both abolitionist and pro-slavery cases. In 1777, Iredell and his friend William Hooper provided legal assistance to more than 40 former slaves emancipated by the Quakers in northeastern North Carolina after the 1777 North Carolina General Assembly ordered the former slaves' seizure and resale. In 1769, Iredell assisted his father, Thomas, in selling a runaway slave and requested herring and red-oak staves as part of the proceeds. In his legal practice, Iredell facilitated the sale of slaves for clients.

Opinions on the Slave Trade Clause 
Iredell addressed Virginian delegate George Mason's objection to Article One, Section 9, Clause 1 of the US Constitution ("Slave Trade Clause") on grounds of practicality. Iredell believed that the Constitution would not be ratified by South Carolina nor Georgia without the inclusion of the Slave Trade Clause, writing, "Our situation...makes it necessary to bear the evil as it is."

While Iredell believed "the interests of humanity" would be advanced through abolition, that slave trade existed too long "for the honor and humanity of those concerned in it," and that its abolition would be "pleasing to every generous mind, and every friend of human nature," he nonetheless believed the ratification of the Constitution would provide a pathway for abolition in the long-term, and that, unless they were beholden to the Constitution, states such as South Carolina and Georgia would never pursue the path of abolition. Therefore, "'though at a distant period,' the provisions for the abolition of the slave trade would 'set an example of humanity.'"

In the time between ratification of the Constitution and abolition, Iredell wrote, "judgement upon slavery in the United States must rest between the individuals' consciousnesses and God."

Slavery in his personal life 
Iredell owned slaves throughout his life. In 1786, Iredell reported owning 14 slaves. Though some surviving records of Iredell's slaves are partly illegible, names of slaves Iredell owned during his lifetime include Peter, Sarah (Peter's wife), Edy, Dundee, and Hannibal. Iredell's brother, Arthur, intended to bequeath slaves he inherited from their father, Thomas, to James after their father's death. However, the transaction fell through, and James transferred the title for the slaves to Arthur. During his lifetime, James Iredell freed some of his slaves, including Peter, Edy, and Dundee, and visited them in subsequent years in Philadelphia. Scholars consider Iredell a "humane master", based upon surviving writings. However, James Iredell and his wife Hannah both owned slaves at the time of their deaths.

Peter 
In his biography of James Iredell, judicial historian Willis Whichard notes Iredell's close relationship with one of his slaves, Peter. Peter regularly traveled with Iredell before gaining his freedom, and was subsequently hired by Iredell. After Peter gained his freedom, Iredell praised a hired servant, David, by comparing him to Peter's performance.

In 1793, when the Iredell family moved from Philadelphia to Edenton, North Carolina, Iredell freed Peter along with 2 other slaves, Edy and Dundee. Peter became a woodcutter after gaining his freedom. He was regularly hired by Iredell when Iredell returned to visit Philadelphia and, on one occasion, check on Hannah Iredell's nephew, James Johnston.

Legacy
Iredell County, North Carolina, was established in 1788 and was named for Iredell.

, a ship in World War II, was named after him.

The James Iredell House at Edenton was listed on the National Register of Historic Places in 1970.

In popular culture 
James Iredell is featured as a character in A More Obedient Wife: A Novel of the Early Supreme Court, a historical novel by Natalie Wexler focused on his wife, Hannah, and her friend Hannah Wilson.

See also 
 List of justices of the Supreme Court of the United States

References

Sources

Further reading

 Flanders, Henry. The Lives and Times of the Chief Justices of the United States Supreme Court. Philadelphia: J. B. Lippincott & Co., 1874 at Google Books.

External links

 Guide to the James Iredell Sr., and James Iredell Jr., papers 1724-1890 and undated, Rubenstein Rare Book & Manuscript Library, Duke University.
 James Iredell, Charge to Grand Jury, in Case of Fries
 North Carolina History Project

|-

1751 births
1799 deaths
18th-century American Episcopalians
18th-century American judges
British emigrants to the Thirteen Colonies
North Carolina Attorneys General
North Carolina Federalists
North Carolina state court judges
People from Lewes
United States federal judges appointed by George Washington
Candidates in the 1796 United States presidential election
Justices of the Supreme Court of the United States
United States federal judges admitted to the practice of law by reading law
People from Edenton, North Carolina